Consco Enterprises was a software development firm headquartered in Edison, New Jersey, United States in the early to late 1980s. Consco's primary product dubbed Consolidation, was based on pegboard accounting principles and designed to generate complex quarterly and annual tax reports for large multi-national corporations. Pegboard systems were and are still sold nationwide by "Control o fax" in Waterloo, Iowa.

The main Consolidation product was later packaged with other Consco financial applications, such as Currency Conversion, which added functionality. The package was named Accounting Information System, or AIS. Some AIS clients included the Ford Motor Company, Campbell Soup Company, Miles Laboratories, LTV Corporation, Owens-Illinois, Texaco, Pennzoil, The Tennessee Valley Authority and Cummins Engine Company.

Consco's shares were traded on NASDAQ under the symbol CNSO. An unrelated company, CNS Response, now uses that symbol.

In 1988, the company sold its product line to Computer Associates. In May 1984, Seymour Altucher was the company's chairman.

References

External links
Business Intelligence Dashboard Reporting Software

Defunct companies based in New Jersey
Companies based in Middlesex County, New Jersey
Software companies based in New Jersey
Companies formerly listed on the Nasdaq
Defunct software companies of the United States